Francesca Porcellato (born 5 September 1970) is an Italian disabled sportsperson who competed at international level in three different sports. Porcellato began her sporting career as a wheelchair racer competing in six Summer Paralympics before switching to Para Cross-country skiing where she won gold at the 2010 Winter Paralympics in the 1 km sprint. In 2015, she became six-time UCI Para-cycling World champion.

Biography
Porcellato was hit by a truck when she was 2 years old and it broke her back. She discovered that she is paralyzed. In addition to participation in the Paralympics, she is one of two women to have won four London Marathon wheelchair races, shared with the Russian-born American Tatyana McFadden. She competed in wheelchair racing at every Summer Paralympic Games from 1988 to 2008, and in 2006 participated in the Winter Paralympics in cross-country sit-skiing. She won a total of two gold, three silver, and five bronze medals, all in athletics. She won the silver medal in the 800 metres T54 race at the 2009 Mediterranean Games.

Statistics

Paralympic appearances
 
Francesca participated in eleven editions of the Paralympic Games, eight  summer and three winter. She was the flag bearer for Italy at Vancouver 2010.

Achievements

Other results
Porcellato won seven International marathons.

New York City Marathon
Wheelchair race: 2001
Boston Marathon
Wheelchair race: 2015
London Marathon
Wheelchair race: 2003, 2003, 2005, 2006
Paris Marathon
Wheelchair race: ????

See also
 Italy at the Summer Paralympics - Multiple medallists

References

External links
 
 Francesca Porcellato at CIP
 Francesca Porcellato at Ability Channel
 Francesca Porcellato at Italian Cycling Federation
 Francesca Porcellato la rossa volante 

1970 births
Living people
People from Castelfranco Veneto
Italian wheelchair racers
Paralympic athletes of Italy
Paralympic cyclists of Italy
Paralympic cross-country skiers of Italy
Athletes (track and field) at the 1988 Summer Paralympics
Athletes (track and field) at the 1992 Summer Paralympics
Athletes (track and field) at the 1996 Summer Paralympics
Athletes (track and field) at the 2000 Summer Paralympics
Athletes (track and field) at the 2004 Summer Paralympics
Cross-country skiers at the 2006 Winter Paralympics
Athletes (track and field) at the 2008 Summer Paralympics
Cyclists at the 2016 Summer Paralympics
Cyclists at the 2020 Summer Paralympics
Paralympic gold medalists for Italy
Paralympic silver medalists for Italy
Paralympic bronze medalists for Italy
Female wheelchair racers
Paralympic wheelchair racers
Medalists at the 1988 Summer Paralympics
Medalists at the 1992 Summer Paralympics
Medalists at the 2000 Summer Paralympics
Medalists at the 2004 Summer Paralympics
Medalists at the 2016 Summer Paralympics
Medalists at the 2020 Summer Paralympics
Medalists at the 2010 Winter Paralympics
Italian female cyclists
Italian female cross-country skiers
Mediterranean Games silver medalists for Italy
Mediterranean Games medalists in athletics
Athletes (track and field) at the 2009 Mediterranean Games
People with paraplegia
Paralympic medalists in athletics (track and field)
Paralympic medalists in cross-country skiing
Paralympic medalists in cycling
Sportspeople from the Province of Treviso